Kinousa is a village in the Paphos District of Cyprus, located  southeast of Makounda.

References

Communities in Paphos District